The Korea Customs Service (KCS) is one of tax organizations in South Korea and is run under the Ministry of Economy and Finance. The headquarters is in Seo District, Daejeon.

References

External links

Official website 

Government agencies of South Korea
Taxation in South Korea
Customs services